Belmonte del Sannio is a comune (municipality) in the Province of Isernia in the Italian region Molise, located about  northwest of Campobasso and about  northeast of Isernia.

Belmonte del Sannio borders the following municipalities: Agnone, Castiglione Messer Marino, Schiavi di Abruzzo.

References

Cities and towns in Molise